American country music artist Sara Evans has received more than six major industry awards and over 34 nominations. She received her first accolade from Billboard for Country Video of the Year for her single "Three Chords and the Truth". She received most of her award nominations from the Academy of Country Music and the Country Music Association. In 2001, Evans was nominated for five accolades from the Country Music Association. She would later win for Video of the Year for the single "Born to Fly". In later years she would be nominated for Female Vocalist of the Year several times. The Academy of Country Music nominated Evans for Top Female Vocalist (later called Female Vocalist of the Year) seven times. In 2005, she won the accolade. Evans has also received award nominations from the American Music Awards, American Country Awards and CMT Music Awards.

Academy of Country Music Awards

!
|-
| 1997
| Sara Evans
| Top New Female Vocalist
| 
| align="center" rowspan="11"| 
|-
| 1998
| "No Place That Far"
| Vocal Event of the Year 
| 
|-
| rowspan="2"| 2000
| "That's the Beat of a Heart" 
| Vocal Event of the Year 
| 
|-
| rowspan="3"| Sara Evans
| rowspan="2"| Top Female Vocalist
| 
|-
| 2001
| 
|-
| 2003
| Top Female Vocalist of the Year
| 
|-
| rowspan="2"| 2004
| Restless
| Album of the Year
| 
|-
| rowspan="4"| Sara Evans
| rowspan="3"| Top Female Vocalist
| 
|-
| 2005
| 
|-
| 2006
| 
|-
| 2011
| Female Vocalist of the Year
| 
|-
|}

American Country Awards

!
|-
| rowspan="2"| 2011
| "A Little Bit Stronger"
| Single of the Year, Female
| 
| align="center" rowspan="2"| 
|-
| Sara Evans
| Female Artist of the Year
| 
|-
|}

American Music Awards

!
|-
| 2000
| rowspan="3"| Sara Evans
| Favorite Country New Artist
| 
| align="center"| 
|-
| 2002
| rowspan="2"| Favorite Country Female Artist
| 
| align="center" rowspan="2"| 
|-
| 2011
| 
|-
|}

Billboard Awards

!
|-
| 1998
| "Three Chords and the Truth"
| Country Video of the Year
| 
| align="center"| 
|-
|}

BMI Country Awards

!
|-
| 2008
| "As If"
| 50 Most Performed Country Songs
| 
| align="center"| 
|-
|}

CMT Music Awards

!
|-
| 2004
| "Perfect"
| Female Video of the Year
| 
| align="center"| 
|-
| 2005
| "Suds in the Bucket"
| Hottest Video of the Year
| 
| align="center"| 
|-
| 2006
| "A Real Fine Place to Start"
| rowspan="3"| Female Video of the Year
| 
| align="center"| 
|-
| 2007
| "You'll Always Be My Baby"
| 
| align="center"| 
|-
| 2011
| "A Little Bit Stronger"
| 
| align="center"| 
|-
| 2022
| "Suds in the Bucket"
| Comeback Song of the Year
| 
| align="center"| 
|-
|}

Country Music Association Awards

!
|-
| rowspan="2"| 1999
| Sara Evans
| Horizon Award
| 
| align="center" rowspan="15"| 
|-
| "No Place That Far" 
| Vocal Event of the Year 
| 
|-
| 2000
| Sara Evans
| Horizon Award
| 
|-
| rowspan="5"| 2001
| Born to Fly 
| Album of the Year
| 
|-
| Sara Evans
| Female Vocalist of the Year
| 
|-
| rowspan="3"| "Born to Fly"
| Music Video of the Year
| 
|-
| Single of the Year
| 
|-
| Song of the Year
| 
|-
| 2002
| rowspan="3"| Sara Evans
| rowspan="3"| Female Vocalist of the Year
| 
|-
| 2004
| 
|-
| rowspan="2"| 2005
| 
|-
| "New Again"
| Vocal Event of the Year 
| 
|-
| 2006
| rowspan="2"| Sara Evans
| rowspan="2"| Female Vocalist of the Year
| 
|-
| rowspan="2"| 2011
| 
|-
| "A Little Bit Stronger"
| Single of the Year
| 
|-
|}

Dove Awards

!
|-
| 2010
| Glory Revealed II: The Word of God In Worship
| Special Event Album
| 
| align="center"| 
|-
|}

Radio & Records

!
|-
| 2006
| Sara Evans
| Reader's Poll – Female Vocalist of the Year
| 
| align="center"| 
|-
|}

References

Evans, Sara